Ice Road Truckers (commercially abbreviated IRT) is a reality television series that aired on History Channel from 2007 to 2017. It features the activities of drivers who operate trucks on ice roads crossing frozen lakes and rivers, in remote territories in Canada and Alaska. Seasons three to six also featured Alaska's improved but still remote Dalton Highway, which is mainly snow-covered solid ground.

History
In 2000, History aired a 46-minute episode titled "Ice Road Truckers" as part of the Suicide Missions (later Dangerous Missions) series. Based on Edith Iglauer's book Denison's Ice Road, the episode details the treacherous job of driving trucks over frozen lakes, also known as ice roads, in Canada's Northwest Territories. After 2000, reruns of the documentary were aired as an episode of the series Modern Marvels, instead. Under this banner, the Ice Road Truckers show garnered very good ratings.

In 2006, the History Channel hired Thom Beers, owner of Original Productions and executive producer of Deadliest Catch, to create a series based on the Ice Road book. Shot in high-definition video (although the season ended before History HD was launched in the US), the show "charts two months in the lives of six extraordinary men who haul vital supplies to diamond mines and other remote locations over frozen lakes that double as roads".

Airings
Season one of Ice Road Truckers was shown on the British national commercial channel Channel Five in February/March 2008. In Australia, it aired on Austar and Foxtel in early 2008, and from June 18 it also began being shown on Network Ten. In autumn 2008 season one aired on RTL 7 in the Netherlands. In Italy. the first season premiered on History Channel on January 7, 2010 as "" ('Heroes of the ice').

The second season premiered on June 8, 2008, in the US; October 9, 2008 on History in the UK and in Australia; November 12, 2008, in New Zealand; and January 7, 2009, on Channel 5 in the UK. The first season was not aired in Canada until March 4, 2009, on History Television. The third season premiered on May 31, 2009, in the US; September 10 in the UK. Channel Five debuted series 3 on January 5, 2010.

Reception
The series' premiere was seen by 3.4 million viewers, to become the most-watched original telecast in the History Channel's 12-year history at that time. Among critics, Adam Buckman of the New York Post said, "Everything about 'Ice Road Truckers' is astonishing". Virginia Heffernan of The New York Times said, "Watching these guys ... make their runs, it’s hard not to share in their cold, fatigue and horrible highway hypnosis, that existential recognition behind the wheel late at night that the pull of sleep and the pull of death are one and the same. ... [I]t gets right exactly what Deadliest Catch got right, namely that the leave-nothing-but-your-footprints, green kind of eco-travelers are too mellow and conscientious to be interesting to watch. Instead, the burly, bearded, swearing men (and women) who blow methyl hydrate into their own transmissions and welcome storms as breaks from boredom ... are much better television." During 2007 the series was shown in the United Kingdom, Australia and various countries in Africa.

The show opening features a truck falling through the ice. While real accidents with fatal outcomes might be mentioned, the show has never featured them; the show opening is a miniature model filmed inside a studio. A season-one rumor that the sequence was staged using a real truck and dynamite caused discontent among the drivers.

Episodes

Truckers

IRT: Deadliest Roads

Season one: Himalayas
On October 3, 2010, a spinoff series, titled IRT: Deadliest Roads, premiered immediately after the season-four finale. Rick Yemm, Alex Debogorski, and Lisa Kelly traveled to India and put their driving skills to the test on the narrow, treacherous mountain roads that lead from Delhi to Shimla, then up to the Karchan and Kuppa hydroelectric dam construction sites in the Himalayas. Debogorski quit in the first episode due to fear of angry mobs if he were involved in an accident, and was replaced by Alabama trucker Dave Redmon (who has since been featured in season five of Ice Road Truckers). As the season continued, the drivers were dispatched to carry supplies over the stormy Rohtang Pass to the town of Keylong, which had been cut off for months due to the bad weather. The season finale aired on December 5, 2010, with the truckers attempting to deliver loads of jet fuel for helicopter crews who were working to rescue people stranded in the mountains by the storms. Yemm and Redmon turned back, deciding that the conditions were too hazardous for the volatile cargo; the next day, Kelly hauled the entire shipment herself and delivered it to the crews, becoming the only North American trucker to complete the entire season.

The roads were often hacked out of vertical cliffs like a tunnel with one side open to the air, with rock overhangs overhead and drops of several hundred feet below. One part of the road was called "the Freefall Freeway".
 In episode five: "Crumbling Roads", Kelly and Yemm delivered two images (one each, well-packed with sandbags, sand, and straw) of the goddess Kali (shown as treading on her husband Shiva) along a risky mountain road hacked out of cliffsides to a temple at a town called Kalpa, Himachal Pradesh.
 In episode six: "Thin Air", they struggled with a worse road and altitude hypoxia on the Rohtang Pass, and one of them delivered an image of Buddha and some Buddhist scriptures to a Tibetan-type Buddhist monastery in the mountains.

Early promotional spots for the series listed the title as IRT: Himalayas.

Season two: South America
The second season of IRT: Deadliest Roads premiered on September 25, 2011. Six North American drivers are sent to Bolivia to haul cargo along the Yungas Road, notorious for its extreme hazards. The drivers work in pairs – Hugh Rowland and Rick Yemm, Lisa Kelly and Dave Redmon, and newcomers Timothy R. Zickuhr and Augustin "Tino" Rodriguez. Redmon and Yemm quit in episode two; Rowland continues driving alone, while Texas trucker G.W. Boles arrives to ride with Kelly in episode four. Starting with episode eight, the truckers relocate to Peru and begin transporting loads to sites high in the Andes mountain range.

On the way, their truck's radiator begins to leak; after they mend it, they must empty all their drinking water into the radiator to replace the loss. Abundant lithium deposits cause their magnetic compasses to read incorrectly, and for a time, their global positioning system malfunctions.

In February 2015, Tim Zickuhr pleaded guilty to kidnapping and extortion, then was sentenced to a maximum of 15 years' prison. Zickuhr's current incarceration and/or parole status are uncertain.

Other media
In 2008, 20th Century Fox acquired rights from the History Channel to create a scripted, theatrical action film based on the series.

In 2010, a video game for the PlayStation Portable was released by Slitherine Software.

See also

 Highway Thru Hell
 Ice Pilots NWT

References

Further reading
 
  (with Michael Lent)

External links
 Official website, History Channel USA
 Official website, History Channel UK
 Official website, History Channel Canada
 Official website, Channel 5 UK
  (2000 documentary film)
 
  (IRT: Deadliest Roads)
 

2000s American reality television series
2000s Canadian reality television series
2007 American television series debuts
2007 Canadian television series debuts
2010s American reality television series
2010s Canadian reality television series
Channel 5 (British TV channel) original programming
English-language television shows
History (American TV channel) original programming
Truckers
Television series by Original Productions
Television shows set in Alaska
Television shows filmed in Alaska
Television shows set in Canada
Television shows filmed in Canada
2017 American television series endings
2017 Canadian television series endings